The Comana (in its upper course also Purcaru) is a left tributary of the river Olt in Romania. It discharges into the Olt in Comana de Jos. Its source is in the Perșani Mountains.

References

Rivers of Romania
Rivers of Brașov County